Sanamxay is a district (muang) of Attapeu province in southern Laos.

Towns and villages
Sanamxai

References

Districts of Attapeu province